Caviibacterium is a genus of bacteria from the class of Pasteurellaceae with one known species (Caviibacterium pharyngocola).

References

Pasteurellales
Bacteria genera
Monotypic bacteria genera